The Duped Journalist (Hungarian: A becsapott újságíró) is a 1914 Hungarian silent film directed by Alexander Korda and Gyula Zilahi.

Cast
Gyula Fehér as Lieutenant Colonel Ipay
Gyula Gózon as Kalotay, reporter
Margit Lánczy as Alice, Wesekövy's daughter
Alajos Mészáros as Baron Félix Káró
Ibolya Nagy as Governess
Gyula Zilahi as Napoleon Wesekövy
László Ö. Fehér as János

References

External links

Hungarian silent films
Films directed by Alexander Korda
Hungarian black-and-white films
Austro-Hungarian films